Rico Escalona Puno is a Philippine technocrat who served as the undersecretary of the Department of the Interior and Local Government between 2010 and 2012.

References

Living people
Kapampangan people
People from Tarlac
Benigno Aquino III administration cabinet members
Year of birth missing (living people)
21st-century Filipino politicians